Niraj S. Shah (born 1973/1974) is an Indian-American millionaire businessman, and co-founder, co-chairman, and CEO of online retailer Wayfair.

Early life
Shah grew up in Pittsfield, Massachusetts, the son of immigrants from India. His grandfather ran a "steel manufacturing business in India, making pots and pans". His father worked for General Electric as a mechanical engineer, and after his retirement, joined Wayfair early on, providing financial advice, and still works for the company.

Shah graduated from Cornell University, where he earned a bachelor's degree in engineering in 1995.

Career
Shah co-founded Wayfair in 2002 with his Cornell classmate, Steve Conine, and has been its CEO since its inception.

Shah was included in the Fortune list of "40 under 40" for 2013.

In 2017, Shah became a director of the Federal Reserve Bank of Boston.

In May 2017, Wayfair's share price rose above $70 per share, making Shah and his co-founder Steve Conine both billionaires. As of April 2022, his estimated net worth was $1.6 billion.

Philanthropy
Shah co-founded the Shah Family Foundation with his wife Jill in 2017, which supports education and healthcare programs.

Personal life
Shah is married to Jill Shah; they have two children, and live in the Back Bay area of Boston. In 2013, Jill Shah sold her alternative medicine directory Jill's List, which employed 7 people, to California-based MINDBODY, and now runs their Boston office.

References

External links
 Shah Family Foundation 

1970s births
American billionaires
American company founders
Cornell University alumni
Federal Reserve Bank people
Living people
People from Pittsfield, Massachusetts